The Atlantic Hockey Rookie of the Year is an annual award given out at the conclusion of the Atlantic Hockey regular season to the best freshman in the conference as voted by the coaches of each Atlantic Hockey team.

Award winners

Winners by school

Winners by position

See also
Atlantic Hockey Awards
MAAC Offensive Rookie of the Year
MAAC Defensive Rookie of the Year

References 

Atlantic Hockey
College ice hockey trophies and awards in the United States